Municipio XIV is an administrative subdivision of the city of Rome. It was first created by Rome's City Council on 19 January 2001 and it has a president who is elected during the mayoral elections.

Originally called Municipio XIX, since 11 March 2013 its borders were modified and its name was changed in Municipio XIV.

Subdivision
Municipio XIV is divided into eight localities:

Politics
Current allocation of seats in the Municipio XIV's parliamentary body as of the 2013 Rome municipal election: 
Democratic Party (PD) 13
People of Freedom (PdL) 4
Left Ecology Freedom 2
Five Star Movement (M5S) 2
Others 2
In June 2013 Valerio Barletta (PD) was elected president. The current majority is formed by Democratic Party and Left Ecology Freedom.

References

External links

Municipi of Rome